Evers Allen Burns (born August 24, 1971) is an American former professional basketball player who was selected by the Sacramento Kings in the 2nd round (31st overall) of the 1993 NBA draft. A 6'8" forward from the University of Maryland, Burns played in only 22 games as a member of the Kings during the 1993–94 NBA season, averaging 2.4 points per game.

In 1998, Burns played 22 games for the Sydney Kings in the Australian National Basketball League.  He also played several seasons in the Continental Basketball Association, for the Sioux Falls Skyforce, Oklahoma City Cavalry, Yakima Sun Kings and Quad City Thunder.

Notes

External links
College & NBA stats @ basketballreference.com
Italian League stats
Liga ACB profile

1971 births
Living people
African-American basketball players
American expatriate basketball people in Argentina
American expatriate basketball people in Australia
American expatriate basketball people in Greece
American expatriate basketball people in Italy
American expatriate basketball people in Spain
American expatriate basketball people in Turkey
American men's basketball players
Basketball players from Baltimore
Dafnis B.C. players
Ferro Carril Oeste basketball players
Joventut Badalona players
Liga ACB players
Maryland Terrapins men's basketball players
Oklahoma City Cavalry players
Quad City Thunder players
Pallacanestro Varese players
Richmond Rhythm players
Sacramento Kings draft picks
Sacramento Kings players
Sioux Falls Skyforce (CBA) players
Sydney Kings players
Yakima Sun Kings players
Power forwards (basketball)
21st-century African-American sportspeople
20th-century African-American sportspeople